Hye-jin ( or ) is a Korean feminine given name. The meaning differs based on the hanja used to write each syllable of the name. There are 16 hanja with the reading "hye" and 47 hanja with the reading "jin" on the South Korean government's official list of hanja which may be used in given names; they are listed in the table at right. It was the second-most popular name for baby girls born in South Korea in 1980, falling to fifth by 1990.

People
People with this name include:

Entertainers
Jang Hye-jin (singer) (born 1965), South Korean singer
Shim Hye-jin (born Shim Sang-gun, 1967), South Korean actress
Jang Hye-jin (actress) (born 1975), South Korean actress
Kim Hye-jin (actress) (born 1975), South Korean actress
Jeon Hye-jin (actress, born 1976), South Korean actress
Han Hye-jin (actress) (born 1981), South Korean actress
Han Hye-jin (model) (born 1983), South Korean fashion model
Jeon Hye-jin (actress, born 1988), South Korean actress
Hwasa (born Ahn Hye-jin, 1995), South Korean singer, member of girl group Mamamoo

Sportspeople
Cho Hey-jin (born 1973), South Korean basketball player
Lee Hye-jin (sport shooter) (born 1985), South Korean sport shooter
Chang Hye-jin (born 1987), South Korean archer
Choi Hye-jin (born 1991), South Korean golfer
Lee Hye-jin (born 1991), South Korean track cyclist
Kim Hye-jin (swimmer) (born 1994), South Korean swimmer
Cho Hye-jin (born 1995), South Korean field hockey player

See also
List of Korean given names

References

Korean feminine given names